is a Japanese manga artist best known for Aishiteruze Baby. Maki debuted in 1999 with Love Service! in Ribon Original magazine. She also has a pet dog named Leo and her profile in the Aishiteruze Baby comic says her hobby is "...blowing soap bubbles" and that one of her skills is "...passing quickly through a crowd of people". She has a sister, Mochida Aki, which she made manga with such as, Zen Zen.

On July 3, 2019, Maki announced that she has retired from the manga industry and that she will keep her Instagram account active until March 17, 2020. Her final manga series was Kirameki no Lion Boy which ran from 2016 to 2019.

Works
14R — Collection of short stories, containing:
14R
Mahiru ni Kakedasu
Watakushi-sama
Koi o Hajimeru Bokutachi ni
Daily News
Aishiteruze Baby (7 volumes)
Atashi wa Bambi (3 volumes) — Also includes:
Kokoro Kirari (vol.1)
Aiko de Jo (vol.2)
Kiite Kiite Ouji (vol.3)
Survival (vol.3)
Kareki ni Koi o Sakasemasu — Collection of short stories, containing:
Kareki ni Koi o Sakasemasu
Heavy Crash!!
Juicy Game
Love Service!
Sora Sora — Also includes:
Koishiterururu
Star Blacks (2 volumes)
Taranta Ranta (2 volumes)
Yamamoto Zenjirou to Moushimasu (5 volumes)
Aishitenai
 Shouri no Akuma
Zen Zen
Green Boy & Blue Girl
Romantica Clock (10 volumes)
Kirameki no Lion Boy (9 volumes)

References

External links
 Ribon Waku-Waku Station Ribon Official website

1981 births
Living people
Manga artists from Kagoshima Prefecture